The Fair of Albacete (Spanish: recinto Ferial de Albacete) is a trade fair ground located in Albacete, Spain.

References 

Buildings and structures in Albacete
Trade fair venues in Spain
Bien de Interés Cultural landmarks in the Province of Albacete